Duff is an unincorporated community in Rock County, Nebraska, United States.

History
A post office was established at Duff in 1892, and remained in operation until it was discontinued in 1901. Duff was likely the name of an early settler.

References

Unincorporated communities in Rock County, Nebraska
Unincorporated communities in Nebraska